Eunate Arraiza Otazu (born 3 June 1991) is a Spanish footballer who plays for Athletic Club in Spain's Primera División.

She is the only deaf player who plays in Primera Division.

Honours

Clubs
Athletic Club
Primera División (1): 2015-16
Euskal Herriko Cup (5): 2013, 2014, 2015, 2016, 2017

International
Spain
 Cyprus Cup: Winner, 2018

References

External links
 
 
 
 
 

1991 births
Living people
Spanish women's footballers
Primera División (women) players
Athletic Club Femenino players
Footballers from Navarre
Deaf association football players
Spain women's international footballers
Women's association football fullbacks
Women's association football midfielders
SD Lagunak (women) players
People from Cuenca de Pamplona
Spanish deaf people
21st-century Spanish women